North Shore United Association Football Club is an amateur football club based in the North Shore, Auckland. They compete in the NRFL Championship, after being relegated in 2022.

Their home ground is Allen Hill Stadium, which is located in the suburb of Devonport.

History
The Club was founded in 1886, making it the oldest football club in New Zealand and Oceania. North Shore United was originally formed as North Shore in 1886 and in 1933 amalgamated with Belmont, taking the present name.

As the result of a sponsorship deal with camera distributor Hanimex, the team was known from 1979 to 1985 as Hanimex United or, unofficially, as Hanimex North Shore United.

Achievements
North Shore United is one of New Zealand's oldest and most successful football clubs. In addition to numerous provincial and regional titles, North Shore United won the National Soccer League in 1977, the New Zealand Superclub League in 1994 and finished as the runner-up three times (1975, 1982, 1983). They also came runner-up in the Lotto Sport Italia NRFL Division 2 (2012), promoting them to the Lotto Sport Italia NRFL Division 1 the following season. The club was promoted to the NRFL Premier in 2018 as runners-up.

North Shore United also has a proud Chatham Cup record, having won the competition on six occasions in 1952 (shared), 1960, 1963, 1967, 1979, and 1986. They also finished as the runner-up six times in 1926 (as North Shore), 1959, 1961, 1973, 1985, and 1995. North Shore United reached the semi-finals of the 2021 competition, but decided to withdraw due to the risks posed by the COVID-19 pandemic.

Players
Many prominent members of the New Zealand national football team have also played for North Shore United. These players include Jason Batty, Duncan Cole, Adrian Elrick, Mark Elrick, Robert Ironside, Darren McClennan, Ian Ormond, Heremaia Ngata, Wynton Rufer, and Keith Hobbs.

Current squad

Honours

New Zealand National Soccer League (Level 1)
Champions (2): 1977, 1994
Runners-up: 1975, 1982, 1983

Northern League (Level 2)
Champions (3): 1973, 2001, 2019
Runners-up: 1971
Auckland provincial championship
Champions (14): 1902, 1906, 1916, 1918, 1919, 1922, 1923, 1938, 1947, 1954, 1959, 1960, 1961, 1963

Chatham Cup
Champions (6): 1952 (shared), 1960, 1963, 1967, 1979, 1986
Runners-up: 1926, 1959, 1961, 1973, 1975, 1995

Club of Pioneers member as of 2017

References

External links

Association football clubs in Auckland
Association football clubs established in 1886
1886 establishments in New Zealand